Tymofiy Mylovanov (born 18 March 1975 in Kyiv) is a Ukrainian economist and former Minister of Economic Development, Trade and Agriculture of Ukraine in the government of Oleksiy Honcharuk.

Biography 
In 1997 Mylovanov received a bachelor's degree in management at the Kyiv Polytechnic Institute. In 1999 he got a master's degree in economics at Kyiv-Mohyla Academy. In 2001 he obtained a master's degree in economics at University of Wisconsin–Madison and in 2004 Mylovanov graduated with a Ph.D. in economics at University of Wisconsin–Madison.

In 2004–2008 Mylovanov worked as postdoctoral and junior professor at University of Bonn.
In 2008–2011 he worked as assistant professor at University of Pennsylvania.
2010–2013 he worked as lecturer at Pennsylvania State University.
From 2015 to 2019 he was an associate professor with tenure in University of Pittsburgh.
From 2016 Mylovanov is a president of Kyiv School of Economics.
In 2014 and 2015 he took the leading places in the Forbes Ukraine ranking of Ukrainian economists who have achieved the greatest success in the scientific field.

On 7 July 2016, the Verkhovna Rada of Ukraine elected him to the council of the National Bank of Ukraine (NBU) and since October 2016 he has held a position of the deputy chairman of the council of the National Bank of Ukraine.

On 29 August 2019 the Verkhovna Rada appointed Tymofiy Mylovanov as Minister of Economic Development, Trade and Agriculture of Ukraine. Mylovanov was offered the position of Minister of Agriculture in the 4 March 2020 formed Shmyhal Government, but he refused because "it would be another type of government where I would not be effective. President Volodymyr Zelensky then offered him a post in the Presidential administration of Ukraine which Mylovanov also refused. He did offer to continue to lead the Ministry of Economy, but he was told "that there were no votes for me."

After his dismissal as government minister Mylovanov was appointed president of the Kyiv School of Economics and returned to the University of Pittsburgh.

See also
 Honcharuk Government

References

External links
 
 University of Pittsburgh, Department of Economics
 Honcharuk's government: who joined the Cabinet of Ministers?

1975 births
Living people
Politicians from Kyiv
Ministry of Economic Development, Trade and Agriculture
21st-century Ukrainian businesspeople
21st-century Ukrainian economists
Businesspeople from Kyiv
Kyiv Polytechnic Institute alumni
National University of Kyiv-Mohyla Academy alumni
University of Wisconsin–Madison College of Letters and Science alumni
Agriculture ministers of Ukraine
University of Pittsburgh faculty
Pennsylvania State University faculty
University of Pennsylvania faculty